Day of the Badman is a 1958 American Western film directed by Harry Keller and starring Fred MacMurray, Joan Weldon and John Ericson.

Plot
Judge Jim Scott (Fred MacMurray) wants to sentence a killer to die, but the outlaw's family members intend otherwise. All-powerful patriarch Charlie Hayes (Robert Middleton) and his intimidating kinfolk are confident they can use violence to get their doomed relative's sentence commuted into something less severe. Although Sheriff Barney Wiley (John Ericson) wilts under the family's strong-arm tactics, Scott remains determined to see justice done at the end of a rope.

Cast
 Fred MacMurray as Judge Jim Scott
 Joan Weldon as Myra Owens
 John Ericson as Sheriff Barney Wiley
 Robert Middleton as Charlie Hayes
 Marie Windsor as Cora Johnson
 Edgar Buchanan as Sam Wyckoff
 Eduard Franz as Andrew Owens
 Skip Homeier as Howard Hayes
 Peggy Converse as Mrs. Quary
 Robert Foulk as Silas Mordigan
 Ann Doran as Martha Mordigan
 Lee Van Cleef as Jake Hayes
 Eddy Waller as Mr. Slocum
 Christopher Dark as Rudy Hayes
 Don Haggerty as Deputy Floyd
 Chris Alcaide as Monte Hayes
Tom London as Roy (uncredited)

See also
 List of American films of 1958

References

External links
 
 
 
 
 

1958 films
1958 Western (genre) films
Films scored by Hans J. Salter
Universal Pictures films
American Western (genre) films
Films directed by Harry Keller
1950s English-language films
1950s American films